Keyonta D. Marshall (August 13, 1981 – March 22, 2019) was an American football defensive lineman who played in the National Football League. The Philadelphia Eagles signed him out of Grand Valley State University. Marshall appeared in one game for the Eagles in 2005, but the team cut him prior to the start of the 2006 season. On November 8, 2006, the New York Jets signed Marshall to their Practice Squad.

References

External links
 NFL.com profile

1981 births
2019 deaths
American football defensive tackles
Grand Valley State Lakers football players
New York Jets players
Philadelphia Eagles players
Sportspeople from Saginaw, Michigan
Players of American football from Michigan